Kalina Stadium is a tennis stadium in Kalina Mumbai, India. It has a centre court, six match courts and six warm-up courts. The stadium is a joint venture of Government of Maharashtra, the All India Tennis Association (AITA) and Mumbai University. As city lacks in proper infrastructure of tennis despite of having many facilities then Chief Minister of Maharashtra Vilasrao Deshmukh agreed to construct this state-of-the-art stadium for tennis. The stadium is home of Mumbai Tennis Masters which plays in Champions Tennis League.

References

Tennis venues in India
Sports venues in Mumbai
Sports venues completed in 2006
2006 establishments in Maharashtra